John Stewart "Mac”Lamb (born 12 April 1907 – 12 June 1983) was a rugby union player who represented Australia.

Lamb, a lock, claimed a total of 3 international rugby caps for Australia.
In 1924 and 1925 he attended Newington College.

References

Australian rugby union players
Australia international rugby union players
1907 births
1983 deaths
People educated at Newington College
Rugby union players from Armidale, New South Wales
Rugby union locks